A circulating water plant or circulating water system is an arrangement of flow of water in fossil-fuel power station, chemical plants and in oil refineries. The system is required because various industrial process plants uses heat exchanger, and also for active fire protection measures. In chemical plants, for example in caustic soda production, water is needed in bulk quantity for preparation of brine. The circulating water system in any plant consists of a circulator pump, which develops an appropriate hydraulic head, and pipelines to circulate the water in the entire plant.

System description

Circulating water pumps

Circulating water systems are normally of the wet pit type, but for sea water circulation, both the wet pit type and the concrete volute type are employed. In some industries, one or two stand-by pumps are also connected parallel to CW pumps. It is recommended that these pumps must be constantly driven by constant speed squirrel cage induction motors. CW pumps are designed as per IS:9137, standards of the Hydraulic Institute, USA or equivalent.

Cooling tower

In the present era, mechanical induced draft–type cooling towers are employed in cooling of water. Performance testing of cooling towers (both IDCT and NDCT) shall be carried
out as per ATC-105 at a time when the atmospheric conditions are within the permissible limits of deviation from the design conditions. As guidelines of Central Electricity Authority, two mechanical draft cooling towers Or one natural draft cooling tower must be established for each 500 MW unit in power plants. The cooling towers are designed as per Cooling Tower Institute codes.

CW treatment system
Some coastal power stations or chemical plants intake water from sea for condenser cooling. They either use closed cycle cooling by using cooling towers or once through cooling. Selection of type of system is based on the thermal pollution effect on sea water and techno-economics based on the distance of power station from the coast and cost of pumping sea water. Due to high salt concentration, it is necessary for circulating water make up.

Mechanical description of CW plants 
Source:

 Five (5) numbers (4 working + 1 standby) circulating water pumps of vertical wet pit type, mixed flow design and self water lubricated complete along with motors and associated accessories.
 Electro-hydraulically operated butterfly valve (with actuators), isolating butterfly valve and rubber expansion joints at discharge of each pump. Electrically operated butterfly valves for interconnection of standby pumps to operate as common standby for both the units.
 One number CW re-circulation line for each unit, suitable for handling a flow of 50% of one CW pump flow with electrically operated butterfly valve (with actuators).
 Complete piping including discharge piping/header of CW pumps, CW duct from CW pump house to condensers and from condensers to the cooling towers, blow down piping (up to ash handling plant and central monitoring basin of ETP), fittings & valves and other accessories as required.
 EOT crane for handling & maintenance of CW pumps and monorail and electrically operated pendant control hoist arrangement for maintenance of stoplog gates and trash racks.
 One number trash rack for CW pump house bay and two numbers of stop logs for CW pump house.
 Air release valves, with isolation valves, in CW piping as per the system requirement.
 Hydraulic transient analysis of CW system.
 CW pump model study and CW pump house/ sump model studies as required.

Codes and standards
Source:

References

External links
 Standard Design Criteria/Guidelines for Balance of Plant for Thermal Power Project 2 X (500MW or above)  Cea.nic.in
  https://law.resource.org/pub/in/bis/S08/is.9137.1978.pdf

Cooling technology
Mechanical engineering
Oil refineries
Power station technology